Harrison Township is one of twelve townships in Vigo County, Indiana, United States. As of the 2010 census, its population was 51,272 and it contained 22,940 housing units. It is entirely contained in Terre Haute's city limits, thus explaining why it is both the most densely populated and the most populated overall.

Geography

Cities and towns
 Terre Haute

Unincorporated communities
 Deming Park
 Dewey
 Duane Yards
 Parkview
 Preston
 Terre Town
 Twelve Points

Boundaries
The boundaries consist of the following streets or features:
 
 North border: Haythorne Avenue
 West border: Wabash River
 South border: Margaret Avenue
 East border: .5 miles east of Fruitridge Street

Adjacent townships
 Otter Creek Township (northeast)
 Lost Creek Township (east)
 Riley Township (southeast)
 Honey Creek Township (south)
 Sugar Creek Township (west)
 Fayette Township (northwest)
 Prairie Township (southwest)

Cemeteries
The township contains these four cemeteries: Calvary, Grandview, Rogers and New Harmony.

Lakes
 Crystal Lake

Demographics 
As of the census of 2000, there were 51,898 people and 20,618 households residing in the township. The population density was 2,262/mi2. The racial makeup of the township was 86.8% White, 9.3% Black or African American, 0.3% Native American, 1.0% Asian, less than 0.1% Pacific Islander, 0.5% from other races, and 2.0% from two or more races. 1.2% of the population were Hispanic or Latino of any race.

The average household size was 2.29 and the average family size was 2.96.
The median age was 31.6 years. For every 100 females, there were 89 males.

The median income for a household in the township was $26,705, and the median income for a family was $35,135. The per capita income for the township was $14,540. 20.6% of the population and 16.4% of families were below the poverty line.

School districts
This township is served by the Vigo County School Corporation.  Several schools are located in this township:

 One high school - Terre Haute North
 Two middle schools - Sarah Scott and Woodrow Wilson (A third school, named Chauncey Rose was closed)
 Ten elementary schools - Benjamin Franklin, Davis Park, Deming, DeVaney, Farrington Grove, Fuqua, Meadows, Ouabache, Sugar Grove, Terre Town

Political districts
 Indiana's 8th congressional district
 State House District 43
 State House District 46
 State Senate District 38

References
 United States Census Bureau 2007 TIGER/Line Shapefiles
 United States Board on Geographic Names (GNIS)
 IndianaMap

External links

Townships in Vigo County, Indiana
Terre Haute metropolitan area
Townships in Indiana